The Batali River is a river in Dominica. It rises on the southern slopes of Morne Diablotins, flowing southwest to reach the Caribbean Sea on the country's northwestern coast, close to the town of Barroui.

Rivers of Dominica